Keelut is a crater on Jupiter's moon Callisto. It is situated near the south pole and is an example of a central pit impact crater. It measures 47 km across.

In the upper part of the image degraded Reginleif crater is visible.

References

Surface features on Callisto (moon)
Impact craters on Jupiter's moons

Impact craters